I Know a Secret marks the ninth album by Ginny Owens. Word Records released the project on November 10, 2014.

Reception

Signaling in a four star review by CCM Magazine, Matt Conner realizes, "Owens has never sounded better." Kevin Davis, indicating in a four and a half star review at New Release Tuesday, recognizes, "I Know a Secret is Ginny's best album of her incredible career." Specifying in a four star review from Jesus Freak Hideout, Mark D. Geil responds, "I Know a Secret is a strong, solid return." Joshua Andre, awarding the album four and a half stars at 365 Days of Inspiring Media, says, "such a personal, emotional, and refreshing album". Rating the album 4.3 out of five for Christian Music Review, Laura Chambers writes, "I Know A Secret assures us that we, too, can have peace that rides the waves, rather than remaining ashore untested."

Track listing

Personnel 
 Ginny Owens – lead vocals, backing vocals, acoustic piano 
 Jeff Roach – keyboards, acoustic piano, programming, drums, strings, string arrangements 
 Josh Bronleewe – programming, electric guitar 
 Jeff Pardo – acoustic piano, Wurlitzer electric piano, synthesizers, programming, acoustic guitar 
 Kyle Buchanan – acoustic guitar, electric guitar, mandolin, ukulele
 Court Clement – electric guitar 
 Scott Denté – electric guitar 
 James Parker – acoustic guitar, electric guitar, mandolin, ukulele 
 Mark Hill – bass 
 Tony Lucido – bass 
 Ken Lewis – drums, percussion 
 John Catchings – cello
 Kristin Wilkinson – viola 
 David Angel – violin
 David Davidson – violin, string arrangements 
 Katie Bronleewe – backing vocals 
 Brandon Payne – backing vocals 
 Christi Griggs Dippel – backing vocals 
 Brooke Dozier – backing vocals 
 Tirzah Payne – backing vocals 
 Erin Tierney – backing vocals 
 Josh Tierney – backing vocals

References

2014 albums
Ginny Owens albums
Word Records albums